Primostek is a village in the Municipality of Metlika in the White Carniola area of southeastern Slovenia. It lies on the right bank of the Lahinja River, close to its confluence with the Kolpa River, next to the border with Croatia. The entire area is part of the traditional region of Lower Carniola and is now included in the Southeast Slovenia Statistical Region.

References

External links

Primostek on Geopedia

Populated places in the Municipality of Metlika